Patricia Flor (October 19, 1961, Nuremberg, Germany -) is a German diplomat who is the incumbent Ambassador of Germany to China. She has also served as the European Union’s Special Representative (EUSR) for Central Asia and as German ambassador to Georgia.  She has also served in Kazakhstan and at the Permanent Mission to the United Nations in New York.  She presented her diplomatic  to the Emperor of Japan on November 22, 2018 as Ambassador of the European Union (EU) to Japan.  She came to that position after having been the German Federal Government Commissioner for Disarmament and Arms Control in Berlin from 2015 to 2018.

Besides her native German, Flor is fluent in English, Russian and French and has what she describes as a “good command” of Georgian.

Before joining the foreign service in 1992, Flor worked as a journalist.

Education
Flor has a Ph.D. from the University of Erlangen-Nuremberg, as well as a master’s in public administration from Harvard University John F. Kennedy School of Government. From 1985 to 1987, Flor was an undergraduate student at the University of Bamberg studying History, Philosophy and Slavonic Studies.

References

German women journalists
Harvard Kennedy School alumni
University of Erlangen-Nuremberg alumni
University of Bamberg alumni
People from Nuremberg
1961 births
Ambassadors of the European Union to Japan
Ambassadors of Germany to Georgia (country)
Ambassadors of Germany to China
Living people